Iron Lord is a video game.

Iron Lord, Lord Iron, or Lord of Iron may also refer to:

 Iron Lord (film), a Russian historical film, 2010
 Lord Iron, a character in Daniel Abraham's novelette "The Cambist and Lord Iron"

Other uses 
Iron Lady (disambiguation)
Iron Duke (disambiguation)
Iron Baron (disambiguation)

See also
Iron Man (disambiguation)
Iron Woman (disambiguation)
Iron Throne (disambiguation)
Iron Crown (disambiguation)